Marie-Antoinette Willemsen called Meyrianne Héglon (21 June 1867 – 11 January 1942) was a Belgian opera singer. After her marriage to the composer Xavier Leroux, she was known as Madame Héglon-Leroux.

Life 
Born in Brussels, Héglon studied with Marie Sax and Barthot, Tequi and Louis-Henri Obin and continued her studies with Rosine Laborde. She made her debut at the Paris Opera in November 1890, as Maddalena in Rigoletto.

She sang at La Monnaie in 1894-1895 and later in 1901-1902. She performed as a guest artist in Ghent in 1898-1899.

Héglon frequently appeared at the Paris Opera from 1897 to 1907. On 7 April 1898, at the Paris Opera, she sang at the world premiere of Tre pezzi sacri by Verdi, with her and Marie Delna as mezzo-sopranos and Aino Ackté and Louise Grandjean as sopranos, as part of the concerts of the Orchestre de la Société des concerts du Conservatoire, conducted by Paul Taffanel. She sang the role of Omphale in the première of Leroux's Astarté in 1901 with Louise Grandjean, Albert Alvarez and Francisque Delmas.

Héglon spent a large part of her career at the Opéra de Monte-Carlo. On 4 October 1898 she signed a contract for three performances of Amneris in Aida, in Italian and four for the premiere of the title role of Isidore de Lara's Messaline. Héglon received considerable support from Camille Saint-Saëns and sang in his Samson and Delilah in 1904.

She appeared in 1898 in the role of Anne Boleyn in Henry VIII at Covent Garden where she also performed on 13 July 1899 in the title role of Messaline with Albert Alvarez in the role of Helion and Maurice Renaud in that of Harès. She also sang in the main opera houses of Belgium.. At the Opéra-Comique, she created the role of La Vougne in Alexandre Georges' Miarka, on 7 November 1905 and also sang in this opera's premiere in London.

After her retirement from the stage, she taught singing. Among her most notable students was the French soprano Ninon Vallin.

On 8 April 1917 her husband, Xavier Leroux, conducted his work Les cadeaux de Noël. The participating artists were all students of Héglon. On 6 April 1918 another work by her husband was performed, 1814. For this performance, she came out of retirement to sing the role of The Mother.

She made four recordings for the Gramophone Company in 1904. Her voice can be heard on the anthology album 
The Record of Singing Volume I (1899-1919).

Repertoire 
Cassandre Les Troyens
Uta Sigurd
Edwige William Tell
Amneris Aida
Dalila Samson and Delilah	
Fricka Die Walküre
Yamina La Montagne Noire by Augusta Holmès
La Reine Hamlet
Anne Henri VIII
Fides Le Prophète

Premieres 
 At the Opéra de Paris 
 1893: Schwertleite in Die Walküre, 12 May
 1894: Myrtale in Thais, 16 March
 1894: Ourvaci in Djelma, 25 May
 1894: Emilia in Otello, 10 October
 1895: Dara in La Montagne noire, 8 February.
 1898: Pyrrha in La Burgonde, 23 December
 1901: Omphale in Leroux's Astarté, February
 1901: Title role of Frédégonde
 1901: Livie in Les barbares, 23 October
 1902: Erda in Siegfried, 3 January.
 Liba in La Cloche du Rhin
 Title role of Handel's Theodora

References and notes 
Notes

References

External links 

 Portraits on ipernity
 Publicité pour les biscuits Lefèvre-Utile, base Joconde, French Ministry of Culture.
 Air de Scozzone  d'Ascanio de Saint-Saëns, 1904 (YouTube)

1867 births
1942 deaths
Musicians from Brussels
Voice teachers
19th-century Belgian women opera singers
Belgian sopranos
20th-century Belgian women opera singers
Women music educators